Mahran Lala (born 7 March 1982) is an Israeli footballer playing for Maccabi Isfiya. Maharan Lala, is in the Hapeol Tel Aviv UEFA cup team, he scored his first European goal, in a 2–1 home defeat to Saint Étienne.

On 17 September 2009, Lala scored the winning goal in Hapoel Tel Aviv's 2–1 2009–10 UEFA Europa League group stage victory over Celtic FC.

References

1982 births
Living people
Israeli footballers
Druze sportspeople
Israeli Druze
Arab-Israeli footballers
Arab citizens of Israel
Maccabi Sha'arayim F.C. players
Hapoel Herzliya F.C. players
Hapoel Bnei Tamra F.C. players
Hapoel Haifa F.C. players
Hapoel Tel Aviv F.C. players
Maccabi Ahi Nazareth F.C. players
F.C. Holon Yermiyahu players
Hapoel Acre F.C. players
Liga Leumit players
Israeli Premier League players
People from Isfiya
Doping cases in association football
Association football forwards